The 2014 Formula Masters China season was the fourth season of the Formula Pilota China series, and the second under the Formula Masters China branding. The championship commenced on 10 May at Zhuhai in China and finished on 21 October at Shanghai in China after eighteen races held at six meetings.

Driving for Cebu Pacific Air by KCMG, James Munro of New Zealand finished the season as the drivers' champion, finishing 28 points clear of his closest rival, Hong Kong's Matthew Solomon, driving for Eurasia Motorsport. Munro started the season strongly, taking six successive wins at the first Zhuhai meeting and the first Shanghai meeting, as well as the opening race at Inje Speedium. Solomon hit back with a streak of his own, with four wins at Inje and Sepang; Munro finished behind him in three of the races, and ultimately went on to win eight races to Solomon's five at the end of the season. Dan Wells of Great Britain – and team-mate to Munro – finished third in the championship, ten points in arrears of Solomon, taking a total of twelve podiums during the season, but it took him until the final four races to take his two wins for the seasons; these wins came at the second Zhuhai and Shanghai meetings.

The only other driver to take a victory during the season was Meritus.GP driver Jake Parsons, who took three victories en route to fourth place in the championship despite only competing in the second half of the season. He took seven podium finishes in his ten starts in the 2014 season. In the teams' championship, Cebu Pacific Air by KCMG were comfortable winners of the title, due to the results of Munro, Wells and Matthew Swanepoel.

Teams and drivers

Race calendar and results
A provisional race calendar was released on 25 October 2013. An updated race calendar was released on 29 January 2014, which dropped the round at Penbay and rescheduled the Sepang round to August as a support round to GT Asia.

Notes

Championship standings

Drivers' championship
 Points for both championships were awarded as follows:

† – Drivers did not finish the race, but were classified as they completed over 75% of the race distance.

Teams' championship

References

External links

Formula Masters China seasons
Formula Masters China season
Formula Masters China season
Masters China